The Reverend Robert Moore (1886 – 1 September 1960) was a Northern Ireland theologian and politician. He was educated at Coleraine Academical Institution and Queen's College, Galway. He took his theological course at Magee College, Derry. Ordained in 1912, he was installed as a minister at Ringsend, County Londonderry.

President of the Ulster Farmers' Union from 1937 to 1940 and from 1941 to 1942. he was returned to the House of Commons of Northern Ireland (Stormont) for North Londonderry from the 1938 election until his death. Moore was made Minister of Agriculture for Northern Ireland on 6 May 1943, in which capacity he ensured that Northern Irish farmers shared in guaranteed prices for all farmers in the United Kingdom and that Northern Irish farmers would be compensated for their remoteness from the British market. He served in this position until his death on 1 September 1960.

Moore was made a member of the Privy Council of Northern Ireland (PC) in 1943.

References

1886 births
1960 deaths
Ulster Unionist Party members of the House of Commons of Northern Ireland
Members of the Privy Council of Northern Ireland
Members of the House of Commons of Northern Ireland 1933–1938
Members of the House of Commons of Northern Ireland 1938–1945
Members of the House of Commons of Northern Ireland 1945–1949
Members of the House of Commons of Northern Ireland 1949–1953
Members of the House of Commons of Northern Ireland 1953–1958
Members of the House of Commons of Northern Ireland 1958–1962
Northern Ireland Cabinet ministers (Parliament of Northern Ireland)
Presbyterian ministers from Northern Ireland
Members of the House of Commons of Northern Ireland for County Londonderry constituencies